The Republican Fascist Party (PFR) was a political party in Italy led by Benito Mussolini during the German occupation of Central and Northern Italy and was the sole legal and ruling party of the Italian Social Republic. The PFR was the successor to the National Fascist Party, but was more influenced by pre-1922 early radical fascism and anti-monarchism, as its members considered King Victor Emmanuel III to be a traitor after his signing of the surrender to the Allies.

History 

After the Nazi-engineered Gran Sasso raid liberated Mussolini, the National Fascist Party (PNF) was revived on 13 September 1943 as the Republican Fascist Party (PFR) and as the single party of the Northern and Nazi-protected Italian Social Republic, informally known as the Salò Republic. Its secretary was Alessandro Pavolini.

Due to the strong control of the Germans, the power of the party in the context of the Republic of Salò was always very limited. To obviate this inherent weakness, the party tried to obtain the support of the few strata of the population who still sympathised with fascism. In the provinces under the control of the Germans it was organised into three entities called Administrative, Assistance and Political. The Assistance, also called the National Fascist Assistance Body, was formed in early October 1943. In the minds of the party leaders, the Assistance was to be a continuation of the powerful cadres of militants and volunteers of the former National Fascist Party.

The PFR did not outlast Mussolini's execution and the disappearance of the Salò state in April 1945. However, it inspired the creation of the Italian Social Movement (MSI) and the MSI has been seen as the successor to the PFR and the PNF. The MSI was formed by former Fascist leaders and veterans of the National Republican Army of the Salò republic. The party tried to modernise and revise fascist doctrine into a more moderate and sophisticated direction.

 led the PFR organisation in Rome until April 1944, when he was named Deputy Secretary of the national party organisation.

Ideology
The PFR sought to reconnect the new party with the pre-1922 early radical fascism. This move attracted parts of the fascist 'Old Guard', who had been sidelined after Mussolini had come to power in 1922. The new party was, however, internally divided with different internal tendencies vying for Mussolini's support. And whilst the PFR revived some of the early revolutionary fascist discourse, it did not return to the anti-clerical positions of the early fascist movement.

Secretary of the PFR 

 Alessandro Pavolini (15 November 1943 – 28 April 1945)

National Congress 
 1st National Congress – Verona, 14–15 November 1943

References 

1943 establishments in Italy
1945 disestablishments in Italy
Anti-communist parties
Antisemitism in Italy
Banned far-right parties
Defunct nationalist parties in Italy
Defunct political parties in Italy
Fascist parties
Italian Social Republic
National syndicalism
Parties of one-party systems
Political parties established in 1943
Political parties disestablished in 1945